An andiruna is a temporary reed hut used during Mandaean priest initiation ceremonies.

Etymology
The term andiruna or ʿndiruna (ʿndruna) literally means 'chamber' and can also be used to refer to a wedding chamber or canopy.

Ceremonial usage

Several different priestly texts, including the Scroll of Exalted Kingship and The Great Supreme World, need to kept in the andiruna hut during the initiation ceremony, or else the ceremony would be deemed invalid without the presence of the texts.

During the tarmida initiation ceremony, the initiating priest (rba) and the novice stay in the andiruna hut for one entire week without sleeping. The priest and the novice emerge from the hut after the 7 days are completed, and the hut is taken down. Afterwards, the novice undergoes 60 days of seclusion at home.

Symbolism
During the priest initiation ceremony, another reed hut, the škinta, is constructed to the north of the andiruna. It symbolizes the World of Light and it covered by a white cloth roof. In contrast, the andiruna has a blue cloth roof to symbolize the color of Ruha. Together, the two adjacent huts symbolize complementary masculine and feminine elements.

The andiruna symbolizes the "female" side, and is associated with the earth (Tibil), laypeople, the left side, silver, and the klila (myrtle wreath). Similarly, in a traditional Persian house, the women's quarters are known as andirūn.

The škinta (cognate with the Hebrew word shekhinah; from the Semitic root š-k-n, associated with dwellings) symbolizes the "male" side, and is associated with the World of Light, priests, the right side, gold, and the taga (crown).

See also
Shkinta
Shekhinah
Sweat lodge in Native American spiritual ceremonies
Tarmida

References

Mandaean buildings
Mandaic words and phrases
Religious buildings and structures